Tomás Manuel Lopes da Silva (born 8 September 1971), simply known as Tomás, is a former Portuguese professional footballer.

Career
After retiring as a player, Tomás joined the technical team of Rio Ave.

References

External links

1971 births
Living people
People from Póvoa de Varzim
Portuguese footballers
Portugal youth international footballers
Association football goalkeepers
Segunda Divisão players
Varzim S.C. players
S.L. Benfica footballers
C.D. Trofense players
F.C. Felgueiras 1932 players
G.D. Chaves players
F.C. Paços de Ferreira players
U.S.C. Paredes players
S.C. Espinho players
GD Bragança players
Sportspeople from Porto District